Let There Be Country is the seventh studio album by country singer Marty Stuart, released in 1992, though it was technically the fourth album he recorded, cut between Marty Stuart and Hillbilly Rock.

Let There Be Country was recorded in 1988, but Columbia Records refused to release it. When Stuart later gained a larger following and became increasingly popular after the releases of Hillbilly Rock and Tempted under MCA Records, Columbia then saw fit to release this album in 1992.

The track "I'll Love You Forever (If I Want To)" was later recorded as "Don't Tell Me What to Do" by Pam Tillis on her 1991 album Put Yourself in My Place.

Track listing

Personnel

 Curtis Allen – guitar
 Flip Anderson – guitar, keyboards, piano, background vocals
 Jack Clement – guitar
 Vassar Clements – fiddle
 T. Michael Coleman – bass
 Stuart Duncan – fiddle
 Emmylou Harris – background vocals
 Warren Haynes – slide guitar
 Jim Hill – bass
 W.S. Holland – drums
 Roy Huskey Jr. – bass
 Kenny Malone – percussion
 Jody Maphis – drums, guitar
 Ralph Mooney – steel guitar
 Mark O'Connor – fiddle
 Alan O'Bryant – background vocals
 Melissa June Prewitt – background vocals
 Mike Rojas – keyboards, piano
 Gove Scrivernor – slide guitar
 Paco Shipp – harmonica
 Marty Stuart – guitar, mandolin, lead vocals
 John Sturdivant – drums
 J.D. Sumner – background vocals
 Barry Tashian – background vocals
 Leon Watson – bass
 Roland White – mandolin

References

Albums produced by Marty Stuart
1992 albums
Marty Stuart albums
Columbia Records albums